Sheikh Hadith Maulvi Habibullah Agha Sab is a Minister of Education of Islamic Emirate of Afghanistan. He is part of the Taliban's hardliner group and Hibatullah Akhundzada loyalist.

Early life
Habibullah Agha was born in Vach Bakhto, Shah Wali Kot, Kandahar in 1954 or 1955. He received basic Islamic education in his village. Agha continued his higher Islamic education in Pakistan.

Career 
Under the first Taliban government (1996-2001), Agha was a judge. He also became Mullah Omar special adviser and the Taliban's spiritual leader.

On 21 September 2022, Hibatullah Akhundzada appointed Agha as the minister of education. His appointment is considered a setback for women's education progress. He started to work as a minister of education on 26 September 2022. On 22 December 2022, he issued a temporary ban for girl school and educational courses above six grades.

Views 
Agha is against open criticism of the Taliban government officials. He suggested that criticism should be said in the government office.

References

Living people
Taliban government ministers of Afghanistan
Education ministers
Year of birth missing (living people)